The Pennsylvania Miners' Story is a 2002 television film. It was written by Elwood Reid and directed by David Frankel. The film is based on the real events occurred at the Quecreek Mine. It was mostly filmed on location at Somerset County, Pennsylvania and some scenes were shot on the actual Quecreek Mine. "The Pennsylvania Miners' Story" was first aired at  ABC on November 24, 2002.

Plot
The film tells the real story of nine miners trapped underground and the attempts to rescue them. Based on the events occurred on the Quecreek Mine between July 24 to 28, 2002.

Production
Disney reportedly paid "$1.35 million ($150,000 to each miner) for the television and book rights."

Cast
 Graham Beckel as Randy Fogle
 Dylan Bruno as Blaine Mayhugh
 Marisa Ryan as Leslie Mayhugh
 JD Souther as Dennis 'Harpo' Hall
 Michael Bowen as Robert 'Boogie' Pugh

Reception
"The Pennsylvania Miners' Story" was nominated for two Golden Reel Awards, in the categories of "Best Sound Editing in Television Long Form - Sound Effects & Foley" and "Best Sound Editing in Television Long Form - Dialogue & ADR".

Anita Gates from The New York Times wrote: "The film captures the elation of the rescue and of renewed hope along the way but doesn't begin to convey the drama of the actual events in Quecreek, Pa. And this was a story in which the news coverage could make a person cry."

Walter Chaw of Film Freak Central wrote: "Tweaking emotions is a fragile pastime, and there's a thin line between "tribute" and "mawkish.""

References

External links
 
 

American television films
Films directed by David Frankel
Films scored by Mason Daring
2000s English-language films
2002 television films